Trinity Episcopal Church is located in Ottumwa, Iowa, United States.  It is a parish church of the Episcopal Diocese of Iowa. The building is a contributing property in the Fifth Street Bluff Historic District on the National Register of Historic Places.

History
The parish was established in 1857. The present church building was completed in 1895, and was designed by Davenport architect Edward Hammatt.

Architecture
The Gothic Revival style building is composed of rusticated limestone. A three-story bell tower is on the west end of the building and the apse is on the east. Because the church is built into the side of a hill both the upper and lower levels of the building open onto the ground level. The church features Gothic arch windows and doors throughout. Buttresses are placed between the windows on both sides of the building. It is considered an excellent example of late 19th century Gothic Revival ecclesiastical design.

References

External links

Parish website

Religious organizations established in 1857
Churches completed in 1895
19th-century Episcopal church buildings
Episcopal church buildings in Iowa
Churches in Wapello County, Iowa
Gothic Revival church buildings in Iowa
National Register of Historic Places in Wapello County, Iowa
Churches on the National Register of Historic Places in Iowa
Historic district contributing properties in Iowa
Buildings and structures in Ottumwa, Iowa
1857 establishments in Iowa